Iona nigrovittata is a species of jumping spiders (family Salticidae) endemic to Tonga. It is the sole species in the genus Iona. It is endemic to Tonga.

References

Salticidae
Endemic fauna of Tonga
Spiders of Oceania
Spiders described in 1882